The men's 400 metres event at the 2001 Summer Universiade was held at the Workers Stadium in Beijing, China on 27, 28, and 29 August.

Medalists

Results

Heats
27 August

Quarterfinals
27 August

Semifinals
28 August

Final
29 August

References

Athletics at the 2001 Summer Universiade
2001